Norbert Hof (2 February 1944 – 8 July 2020) was an Austrian footballer who played as a defender.

He is the brother of footballer Erich Hof.

References

External links
 Norbert Hof at Rapid Archiv 
 
 

1944 births
2020 deaths
Austrian footballers
Austria international footballers
Association football defenders
Austrian Football Bundesliga players
Bundesliga players
Wiener Sport-Club players
Hamburger SV players
SK Rapid Wien players